Anne Villeneuve may refer to:

 Anne Villeneuve (illustrator) (born 1966), Canadian writer and illustrator
 Anne Villeneuve (scientist), American geneticist

See also
 Annie Villeneuve (born 1983), French-Canadian pop singer-songwriter